The santur (also santūr, santour, santoor), is a hammered dulcimer of Iranian origins.

History

The santur was invented and developed in the area of Iran and Mesopotamia. "The earliest sign of it comes from Assyrian and Babylonian stone carvings (669 B.C.); it shows the instrument being played while hanging from the player's neck" (35). This instrument was traded and traveled to different parts of the Middle East. Each country customized and designed its own versions to adapt to their musical scales and tunings. The original santur was made with wood and stones and strung with goat intestines. The Mesopotamian santur has been claimed to be the father of the harp, the Chinese yangqin, the harpsichord, the qanun, the cimbalom, and the American and European hammered dulcimers.

Name
The name 'santur' may come from Arabic sanṭīr, a borrowing of the Greek ψαλτήριον 'psalterion'. The Biblical Aramaic form psantērīn is found in the Book of Daniel 3:5.

Description
The oval-shaped mezrabs (mallets) are feather-weight and are held between the thumb, index, and middle fingers. A typical Persian santur has two sets of nine bridges, providing a range of approximately three diatonic octaves. The mezrabs are made out of wood with tips that may or may not be wrapped with cotton or felt.

The right-hand strings are made of brass or copper, while the left-hand strings are made of steel.
A total of 18 bridges divide the santur into three positions.  Over each bridge cross four strings tuned in unison, spanning horizontally across the right and left side of the instrument. There are three sections of nine pitches: each for the bass, middle, and higher octave called behind the left bridges comprising 27 tones altogether. The top "F" note is repeated twice, creating a total of 25 separate tones on the santur. The Persian santur is primarily tuned to a variety of different diatonic scales utilizing 1/4 tones which are designated into 12 modes (dastgahs) of Persian classical music. These 12 Dastgahs are the repertory of Persian classical music known as the Radif. They also had 16 inch botos.

Derivations
Similar musical instruments have been present since medieval times all over the world, including  Armenia, China, Greece, India, etc. The Indian santoor is wider, more rectangular and has more strings. Its corresponding mallets are also held differently and played with a different technique. The eastern European version of the santur called the cimbalom, which is much larger and chromatic, is used to accompany Hungarian folk music, Eastern European Jewish music, and Slavic music, as well as Romani music.

Iraqi santur

The Iraqi santur  (also santour, santoor ) is a hammered dulcimer of Mesopotamian origin. It is a trapezoid box zither with a walnut body and 92 steel (or bronze) strings. The strings, tuned to the same pitch in groups of four, are struck with two wooden mallets called "midhrab". The tuning of these 23 sets of strings extends from the lower yakah (G) up to jawab jawab husayni (a). The bridges are called dama (chessmen in Iraqi Arabic) because they look like pawns. It is native to Iraq, Syria, India, Pakistan, Turkey, Iran, Greece (the Aegean coasts) and Azerbaijan.

It is the main instrument used in the classical Maqam al-iraqi tradition along with the Iraqi spike fiddle joza. ('Music of the Arabs' ).
The instrument was brought to Europe by the Arabs through North Africa and Spain during the Middle Ages and also to China where it was referred to as the "foreign qin".

The Iraqi santur has, since its inception, been fully chromatic allowing for full maqam modulations. It uses 12 bridges of steel strings on both sides. Three of these bridges are movable: B half flat qaraar, E half flat, and B half flat jawaab. The non-standard version of the Iraqi santur includes extra bridges so that there's no need to move those three bridges. However, playing it is a bit harder than playing the standard 12-bridge santur. For a video demonstration, see Wesam al-Azzawy's video links in the sections below.

Notable players

Iran

 Abol Hassan Saba
 Manoochehr Sadeghi
 Faramarz Payvar
 Mohammad Heydari
 Parviz Meshkatian
 Majid Kiani 
 Ahad Behjat
 Nasser Rastegar-Nejad
 Masoud Rezaei Nejad
 Milad Kiayie
 Omid Tahmasebpour
 Mohammad Sadeq Khan 
 Ali Akbar Shahi 
 Hassan Khan 
 Hussein Malek 
 Habib Soma’i 
 Reza Varzandeh 
 Reza Shafieian
 Mansur Sarami 
 Masoud Shaari 
 Siamak Aghayi
 Sourena Sefati
 Mohammad Santour Khan 
 Daryoush Safvat 
 Jalal Akhbari 
 Pouya Saraei
 Ardavan Kamkar
 Pejman Azarmina
 Pashang Kamkar
 Peyman Heydarian
 Kourosh Zolani
 Arfa Atrai 
 Azar Hashemi 
 Susan Aslani 
 Manijeh Ali Pour
 Hayaf Yassine
 Masoud Malek

Iraq
Notable players of the Iraqi santur include:

 Abdallah Ali (1929–1998)
 Akram Al Iraqi
 Amir ElSaffar
 Azhar Kubba
 Bahir Hashem Al Rajab
 Basil al-Jarrah
 Ghazi Mahsub al-Azzawi
 Hugi Salih Rahmain Pataw (1848–1933)
 Hashim Al Rajab
 Hala Bassam
 Hammudi Ali al-Wardi
 Haj Hashim Muhammad Rajab al-Ubaydi (1921–2003)
 Hendrin Hikmat (1974–)
 Heskel Shmuli Ezra (1804–1894)
 Mohamed Abbas
 Muhammad Salih al-Santurchi (18th century)
 Muhammad Zaki Darwish al-Samarra'i (1955–)
 Mustafa Abd al-Qadir Tawfiq
 Qasim Muhammad Abd (1969–)
 Rahmatallah Safa'i
 Sa'ad Abd al-Latif al-Ubaydi
 Sabah Hashim
 Saif Walid al-Ubaydi
 Salman Enwiya
 Salman Sha'ul Dawud Bassun (1900–1950)
 Sha'ul Dawud Bassun (19th century)
 Shummel Salih Shmuli (1837–1915)
 Wesam al-Azzawy (1960–)
 Yusuf Badros Aslan (1844–1929)
 Yusuf Hugi Pataw (1886–1976)

Greece
Players of the Greek Santouri include:

Tasos Diakogiorgis
Aristidis Moschos
 Marios Papadeas
Loukia Valasi
Stella Valasi
Ourania Lambropoulou

India 
Notable players of the Indian santoor include:
Ulhas Bapat (1950–2018)
Tarun Bhattacharya (b. 1957)
Rahul Sharma (b. 1972)
Shivkumar Sharma (b. 1938)
Abhay Sopori
Bhajan Sopori (b. 1948)
R. Visweswaran (1944–2007) 
Varsha Agrawal (b. 1967)
Mohammad Tibet Baqal (1914–1982)
Harjinder Pal Singh (b. 1953)
 Sandip Chatterjee

Germany
 (Dr. Bee Seavers) disciple of Pt. Shivkumar Sharma

Poland
 Jarosław Niemiec

Turkey
 Santuri Ethem Bey composer of Sehnaz Longa

Lebanon
 Marcel Ghrayeb

From around the world

Versions of the santur or hammered dulcimer are used throughout the world. In Eastern Europe, a larger descendant of the hammered dulcimer called the cimbalom is played and has been used by a number of classical composers, including Zoltán Kodály, Igor Stravinsky, and Pierre Boulez, and more recently, in a different musical context, by Blue Man Group. The khim is the name of both the Thai and the Khmer hammered dulcimer. The Chinese yangqin is a type of hammered dulcimer that originated in Persia. The santur and santoor are found in the Middle East and India, respectively.

 Afghanistan – santur
 Armenian - սանթուր (sant'ur)
 Azerbaijan – santur
 Austria – Hackbrett
 Belarus – Цымбалы (tsymbaly)
 Belgium – hakkebord
 Brazil – saltério
 Cambodia – khim
 Catalonia – saltiri
 China – 扬琴 (yangqin)
 Croatian – cimbal, cimbale
 Czech Republic – cimbál
 Denmark – hakkebræt
 France – tympanon
 Germany – Hackbrett
 Greece – santouri
 Hungary – cimbalom
 India – santoor

 Iran – santur
 Iraq – santur
 Ireland – tiompan
 Italy – salterio
 Korea – yanggeum 양금
 Laos – khim
 Latgalia (Latvia) – cymbala
 Latvia – cimbole
 Lithuania – cimbalai, cimbolai
 Mongolia – ёочин yoochin
 Netherlands – hakkebord
 Norway – hakkebrett
 Pakistan – santur
 Poland – cymbały
 Portugal – saltério
 Romania – ţambal

 Russia – цимбалы tsimbaly, Дульцимер (dultsimer)
 Serbia – цимбал (tsimbal)
 Slovakia – cimbal
 Slovenia – cimbale, oprekelj
 Spain (and Spanish-speaking countries) – salterio, dulcémele
 Sweden – hackbräde, hammarharpa
 Switzerland – Hackbrett
 Thailand – khim
 Turkey – santur
 Ukraine – Цимбали tsymbaly
 United Kingdom – hammered dulcimer
 United States – hammered dulcimer
 Uzbekistan – chang
 Vietnam – đàn tam thập lục (lit. "36 strings")
 Yiddish – tsimbl

See also
Persian traditional music

Gallery

References

Bibliography
Al-Hanafi, Jalal (1964). Al-Mughannūn al-Baghdādīyyūn wa al-Maqām al-ʻIrāqī. Baghdad: Wizarat al-Irshad.
Touma, Habib Hassan (1996). The Music of the Arabs, trans. Laurie Schwartz. Portland, Oregon: Amadeus Press. .
Children's Book of Music'

Further reading
Duchesne-Guillemin, Marcelle (1980). "Sur la restitution de la musique hourrite". Revue de Musicologie 66, no. 1 (1980): 5–26.
Duchesne-Guillemin, Marcelle (1984). A Hurrian Musical Score from Ugarit: The Discovery of Mesopotamian Music, Sources from the Ancient Near East, vol. 2, fasc. 2. Malibu, CA: Undena Publications. 
Fink, Robert (1981). The Origin of Music: A Theory of the Universal Development of Music. Saskatoon: Greenwich-Meridian.
Gütterbock, Hans (1970). "Musical Notation in Ugarit". Revue d'assyriologie et d'archéologie orientale 64, no. 1 (1970): 45–52.

Kilmer, Anne Draffkorn (1971). The Discovery of an Ancient Mesopotamian Theory of Music. Proceedings of the American Philosophical Society 115:131–49.
Kilmer, Anne Draffkorn (1974). "The Cult Song with Music from Ancient Ugarit: Another Interpretation". Revue d'Assyriologie 68:69–82. 
Kilmer, Anne Draffkorn (1997). "Musik, A: philologisch". Reallexikon der Assyriologie und vorderasiatischen Archäologie 8, edited by Dietz Otto Edzard, 463–82. Berlin: De Gruyter. .
Kilmer, Anne (2001). "Mesopotamia §8(ii)". The New Grove Dictionary of Music and Musicians, second edition, edited by Stanley Sadie and John Tyrrell. London: Macmillan Publishers.
Kilmer, Anne Draffkorn, Richard L. Crocker, and Robert R. Brown (1976). Sounds from Silence: Recent Discoveries in Ancient Near Eastern Music. Berkeley: Bit Enki Publications, 1976. Includes LP record, Bit Enki Records BTNK 101, reissued [s.d.] as CD. 
Vitale, Raoul (1982). "La Musique suméro-accadienne: gamme et notation musicale". Ugarit-Forschungen 14 (1982): 241–63.
Wellesz, Egon, ed. (1957). New Oxford History of Music Volume I: Ancient and Oriental Music. Oxford: Oxford University Press.
West, M[artin]. L[itchfiel]. (1994). "The Babylonian Musical Notation and the Hurrian Melodic Texts". Music and Letters 75, no. 2 (May): 161–79.
Wulstan, David (1968). "The Tuning of the Babylonian Harp". Iraq 30:215–28. 
Wulstan, David (1971). "The Earliest Musical Notation". Music and Letters 52 (1971): 365–82.

External links

Santur – The Art of Persian Music
 The Persian music and the santur instrument
Santur introduction in American Lutherie magazine
Nay-Nava Encyclopedia entry on the santur
Dr. Ümit Mutlu's information on the santur (in Turkish)
Santur history (in Turkish)
The Iraqi Santur

Hammered box zithers
Arabic musical instruments
Iranian musical instruments
Azerbaijani musical instruments
Articles containing video clips
Iranian inventions